The following is a list of coaches who have coached the Western Bulldogs, previously known as Footscray, at a game of Australian rules football in the Australian Football League (AFL), formerly the VFL.

 
 Statistics are correct as of Round 5, 2021

Key: 
 P = Played
 W = Won
 L = Lost
 D = Drew
 W% = Win percentage

References
Western Bulldogs Coaches Win–loss records at AFL Tables

Western Bulldogs Football Club coaches

Western Bulldogs coaches